Figure 53, LLC is an American technology company based in Baltimore, Maryland. Figure 53's flagship product is QLab, a proprietary cue-based multimedia playback system for macOS for use in theatre and other forms of live performance. Some of their other products include Go Button and QLab Remote.

History 
By the time Figure 53 was incorporated in Maryland in March 2006, QLab had been in development for over 2 years. Over time, it has evolved into an industry standard for show control. In 2018, Figure 53 announced the acquisition of the defunct Playhouse Theatre building, and revamped it to create The Voxel theatre in 2020. The Voxel serves both as a research lab for the company and as a theatre intended to promote and facilitate technological experimentation in performance art.

References 

Software companies of the United States
Companies based in Baltimore
Privately held companies based in Maryland
2006 establishments in the United States
Software companies established in 2006
Companies established in 2006